Crawford Douglas (February 10, 1931 – December 15, 1995) was a Liberal party member of the House of Commons of Canada. He was a broadcaster by career, particularly for CKNX-TV in Wingham, Ontario.

He was elected at the Bruce riding in the 1974 general election and served in the 30th Parliament. In 1976 and 1977, he served as Deputy Whip for the governing Liberals and chaired the Standing Committee on Broadcasting, Films and Assistance to the Arts. Crawford was defeated in the 1979 federal election by Gary Gurbin of the Progressive Conservative party, as the riding was renamed to Bruce—Grey. He died on December 15, 1995, aged 64.

References

1931 births
1995 deaths
Members of the House of Commons of Canada from Ontario
Liberal Party of Canada MPs
People from Guelph